Manigotagan River Provincial Park is a nature park in the province of Manitoba, Canada, named for the whitewater Manigotagan River that runs through it. Designated as a provincial park by the Government of Manitoba on 1 December 2004, it is the 80th provincial park in Manitoba. It is considered to be a Class II protected area under the IUCN protected area management categories.

Natural environment 
The area's topography includes sheer rock faces topped with jack pine and rock tripe lichen on the upstream stretches; as well as balsam poplar, green ash, and elderberry near the river mouth. The area also includes Prickly Pear Cactus and Canada yew, as well as wildlife moose, black bear, wolf, and woodland caribou.

See also
List of protected areas of Manitoba
Manigotagan, Manitoba

References

External links

Find Your Favorite Park: Manigatogan River Provincial Park

Provincial parks of Manitoba
Parks in Eastman Region, Manitoba
Protected areas of Manitoba